Goldwater Air National Guard Base, formerly Sky Harbor Air National Guard Base, is a facility of the United States Air National Guard that exists adjacent to Phoenix Sky Harbor International Airport. It was built as the result of a 99-year lease in 1949, and was rebuilt in the 1990s to accommodate the creation of a third runway at the airport.

On December 9, 2016, the Phoenix Sky Harbor Air National Guard Base was renamed Goldwater Air National Guard Base in honor of former United States Senator from Arizona and former Arizona Air National Guard member, Barry Goldwater.

The Arizona Air National Guard's 161st Air Refueling Wing is based at Goldwater Air National Guard Base.

References

Installations of the United States Air Force in Arizona
Installations of the United States Air National Guard
2016 establishments in Arizona
Phoenix Sky Harbor International Airport